The Electrocutioner is an alias used by three fictional characters in the DC Universe, all minor enemies of the superhero Batman.

Publication history
The first Electrocutioner (known only as Buchinsky) appeared in Batman #331 (January 1981) and was created by writers Marv Wolfman and Michael Fleisher and artist Irv Novick.

The Electrocutioner II first appeared in Detective Comics #626 (February 1991) and was created by Wolfman and artist Jim Aparo.

Lester Buchinsky, the Electrocutioner III, first appeared in Detective Comics #644 (May 1992) and was created by writer Chuck Dixon and artists Tom Lyle and Scott Hanna.

Fictional character biography

Buchinsky
Buchinsky (first name unknown) is a self-appointed executioner of criminals in Gotham City who uses an electrically charged suit and goes by the name "Electrocutioner". Batman has three encounters with him. In the first, the Electrocutioner murders killer Mike Caine; in the second, Batman rescues Dane Whitney; in the third, the Electrocutioner falls through a window, grips a metal railing, and shocks himself so that he lets go and plunges off a cliff into the river below.

The Electrocutioner later goes to Manhattan. He encounters two muggers in Central Park and attacks them with lethal doses of electricity from his gauntlets. The Vigilante, meanwhile, continues to cut a bloody swathe of bodies in the name of justice. He breaks into Charles McDade's limousine and shoots McDade and his lady friend Mona Simpson to death. That evening, the Vigilante learns that the Electrocutioner is back in town and is, in fact, targeting the same criminal element that the Vigilante himself is. The Electrocutioner is eventually killed by the Vigilante.

When S.T.A.R. Labs opened a portal to Limbo in Operation Zeppelin, they did this as various deceased criminals wished to return to the earthly realm through the portal. These criminals included the Electrocutioner, the Icicle I, Clayface II, El Papagayo, the Iron Major, and the Top. When Operation Zeppelin's creator Director Jeffrey Simon disappeared, a rescue party went through the portal and the villains captured them. They bargained with their demonic jailer, a demon impersonating Etrigan the Demon, exchanging their prisoners to gain temporary mortal forms and preparing to return to Earth. They were opposed by the Hawk, the Dove, and the Titans West. The battle was fierce, but the tide turned when J.E.B. Stuart came down from Heaven and gave the Hawk his Haunted Tank. The false Etrigan offered them a way out through another portal, but he was merely toying with the dead villains: when he sent them through the portal, it turned out to be an entrance to Hell.

Electrocutioner II
The second Electrocutioner used a red costume rigged to generate a lethal electrical shock against criminals (including Cannon and Saber), and ran afoul of Batman, who disapproved of his extreme justice. His real name was never revealed.

Lester Buchinsky
Lester Buchinsky is the brother of the original Electrocutioner. Originally fighting for justice just like his brother, he later became a criminal and a mercenary. Overly reliant on his ability to generate electricity, the Electrocutioner III has faced (and been defeated by) Batman, Robin, and Nightwing. In at least one scheme, working with the Cluemaster to steal an armored car full of money, the Spoiler works to oppose him. The Spoiler turned out to be the Cluemaster's daughter. The stupidity of Lester's second partner, a hulking brute with delusions of intelligence calling himself Czonk the Baffler, would also hamper their plans. For a time, Lester was frequently seen in the employ of Blüdhaven crime boss the Blockbuster II. In Infinite Crisis, Lester became a member of the Secret Society of Super Villains. During the 34th week of the series 52, the Electrocutioner III appeared as part of a Suicide Squad operation against Black Adam.

In the Rise and Fall storyline, the Green Arrow is still hunting the Electrocutioner III and those who worked with Prometheus; keeping secret his murder of the man as the rest of the Justice League tries to track him down. The Green Arrow confronts the Electrocutioner III, who set off the device that devastated Star City in Justice League: Cry for Justice. He was close to killing the man when the Black Canary stops him during their argument. The Black Canary then realizes what the Green Arrow did; thus, the Electrocutioner III escapes from the Green Arrow's attempt to bring him down. Although the Electrocutioner III was defeated and horrifically injured by Speedy,the Green Arrow's arrival convinces Speedy that killing is not the answer and the two archers take him into custody. Once the Electrocutioner III awoke from his coma, Roy Harper vowed revenge. He broke into the jail and killed the Electrocutioner III, despite the Green Arrow's protests.

Skills and equipment
All of the Electrocutioners wore a special costume lined with built-in circuitry that allows them to project bolts of electricity for either stunning or killing their targets. They even have expertise in weaponry.

In other media

Television
 The Electrocutioner makes non-speaking appearances in Justice League Unlimited. In the episode "The Cat and the Canary", he takes part in Roulette's Meta-Brawl. As of the episode "The Great Brain Robbery", he has joined Gorilla Grodd's Secret Society.
 The Electrocutioner appears in Gotham, portrayed by Christopher Heyerdahl. This version is Jack Buchinsky, a sociopathic inmate in Arkham Asylum charged with murder who experiments on other inmates with electroconvulsive therapy and initially goes by the alias "Jack Gruber".

Film
The Electrocutioner appears in Batman: Bad Blood, voiced by Robin Atkin Downes. This version works for Talia al Ghul before he is killed by the Heretic.

Video games
 The Electrocutioner appears as a boss in Batman: The Video Game. This version wields an electric sword-arm capable of firing arcing high-voltage projectiles and works for the Joker.
 The Electrocutioner appears as an assist character in Scribblenauts Unmasked: A DC Comics Adventure.
 The Lester Buchinsky incarnation of Electrocutioner appears in Batman: Arkham Origins, voiced by Steve Blum. This version is an assassin hired by the Joker disguised as Black Mask to kill Batman, who easily defeats the Electrocutioner and tracks him to the Joker and the other assassins' location. In retaliation, the Joker kills the Electrocutioner before Batman takes the latter's shock gloves to assist him in his crime-fighting, though he eventually turns them over to the Gotham City Police Department (GCPD) off-screen.

Miscellaneous
An unnamed incarnation of the Electrocutioner makes a cameo appearance in the Batman: Arkham Knight prequel comic. This version claims to be an underling of Lester Buchinsky, having acquired several of Buchinsky's prototypes and modified them using Wayne Industries technology. Following the events of Batman: Arkham City, this Electrocutioner attacks Batman, who defeats him quickly as well before leaving him for the GCPD. However, the Arkham Knight finds Electrocutioner first and kills him.

See also
 List of Batman family enemies

References

Batman characters
Comics characters introduced in 1981
Comics characters introduced in 1991
Comics characters introduced in 1992
Characters created by Chuck Dixon
Characters created by Jim Aparo
Characters created by Marv Wolfman
Characters created by Michael Fleisher
Fictional characters with disfigurements
Fictional characters with electric or magnetic abilities
Fictional mercenaries in comics
Fictional murdered people
DC Comics supervillains
DC Comics television characters